Mormon Tabernacle Choir & Friends is a studio album by the Mormon Tabernacle Choir featuring several prominent collaborating artists including Sting, Yo-Yo Ma, David Foster, Amy Grant, James Taylor, Santino Fontana, Renée Fleming, Brian Stokes Mitchell, Sissel, Bryn Terfel, Angela Lansbury, and The King's Singers. The album topped the Billboard Classical Crossover Albums chart for the week of June 3, 2017, its second week on the chart.

Track listing

Charts

References

Tabernacle Choir albums
2017 albums